Following 1967 Maharashtra legislative elections, incumbent chief minister Vasantrao Naik was re-elected for a second term. His second government remained in place until 1972 elections, being succeeded by his third government.

List of ministers

References

Indian National Congress
N
N
Cabinets established in 1967
Cabinets disestablished in 1972